Ron Palmeri is an American venture capitalist and entrepreneur. In 2011, Palmeri co-founded Prism Skylabs, a technology company that optimizes offline commerce. The founders he works with describe him as a "dedicated coach who gives excellent advice."

Biography 

Palmeri was born in  New York, New York.  He graduated from Middlebury College with Bachelor of Arts degrees in both History and French, and also attended SciencesPo in Paris. He moved to San Francisco, California after college.

Minor Venutures 

Previously, Palmeri ran Minor Ventures, a technology-focused venture capital firm. In 2012, Palmeri began MkII Ventures, which provided funding for Prism Skylabs.

Layer 

Palmeri is a Co-Founder of Layer, winner of Techcrunch Disrupt SF 2013. Layer is a communications platform for the internet.

References 

Year of birth missing (living people)
Living people
Businesspeople from New York City
American venture capitalists